On March 3, 2021, 12:16:09 (UTC +2) the 2021 Larissa earthquake had a magnitude of 6.3  with an intensity of VIII (Severe) on the Mercalli Scale 9 kilometers west of Týrnavos, Greece. One person was confirmed dead with eleven other people injured. Light shaking was also felt as far as Albania, North Macedonia, Kosovo and Montenegro.

Earthquake

The earthquake was recorded as a magnitude 6.3 earthquake by the United States Geological Survey, while the Institute of Geodynamics in Athens recorded it as a magnitude 6.0 earthquake.

Seismological events are quite common in Greece. In 2020 a 7.0 earthquake rattled the Aegean Sea killing at least 119 people (Two in Greece). In 1999 an earthquake occurred near the capital Athens, killing more than 100 people.

Aftershocks 
There were numerous aftershocks following the mainshock, the strongest of which was a magnitude 5.8 that occurred 11 km East of Verdikoussa that further worsened already severely damaged houses and other infrastructure.

Casualties
There were numerous reports of damage mostly along Central Greece including old churches and infrastructure, several buildings and houses, one of them was a primary school built in 1938 as well as 63 students that were attending classes in the village of Damasi. There were also power interruptions in the City of Volos and the entire Magnesia Prefecture and travel disruptions between numerous towns due to landslides.

The body of an elderly man was found under the rubble of his own home by rescue teams, and eleven other people sustained injuries.

See also 
List of earthquakes in 2021
List of earthquakes in Greece
2020 Aegean Sea earthquake
1999 Athens earthquake
2021 Crete earthquake
1954 Sofades earthquake

References 

 

2021 earthquakes
Earthquakes in Greece
2021 earthquake
March 2021 events in Greece
2021 disasters in Greece